Yang Xuanzhi was a Chinese writer and translator of Mahayana Buddhist texts into the Chinese language, during the 6th century, under the Northern Wei Dynasty.

Yang wrote "The Monasteries of Luoyang" in 547. This text relates the introduction of Buddhism to China around 70 CE:

His book also contains the first known account of the Buddhist monk Bodhidharma, founder of Zen, whom he met in Luoyang around 520. He describes him as a man of Central Asian origin, who claims to be 150 years old and to have traveled extensively throughout Buddhist lands. He also wrote that Bodhidharma expressed praise for the beauty of the Buddhist temples in Luoyang, and that he chanted the name of the Buddha frequently:

Notes

References
"Zen-A way of life", by Christmas Humphreys 
"A Record of Buddhist Monasteries in Lo-Yang" by Yang Xuanzhi（杨衒之)，translated by Yi-t'ung Wang（王伊同，Princeton University Press，Princeton，New Jersey，1983
"Memories of Lo-yang: Yang Hsuan-chih and the Lost Capital (493–534)"  Jenner, William John Francis. New York: Clarendon Press, Oxford University Press, 1981.
Theobald, Ulrich (2010), Luoyang qielan ji 洛陽伽藍記 "The Monasteries of Luoyang". 

Northern Wei Buddhists
Northern Wei writers